Ribes erythrocarpum is an uncommon North American species of currant known by the common name Crater Lake currant. It is native to the Cascade Mountains in the US State of Oregon, including inside Crater Lake National Park.

Ribes erythrocarpum is a trailing shrub with vertical branches up to 50 cm (20 inches) tall. It produces copper- or salmon-colored flowers and scarlet egg-shaped berries.

References

erythrocarpum
Plants described in 1896
Flora of Oregon
Crater Lake National Park
Flora without expected TNC conservation status